This is the complete list of Asian Games medalists in board games  of chess, go, xiangqi and contract bridge from 2006 to 2018.

Bridge

Men's pair

Men's team

Women's pair

Mixed pair

Mixed team

Supermixed team

Chess

Men's individual
 Rapid: 2006–2010

Men's team
 Standard: 2010

Women's individual
 Rapid: 2006–2010

Women's team
 Standard: 2010

Mixed team
 Standard: 2006

Go

Men's team

Women's team

Mixed pair

Xiangqi

Men's individual
 Standard: 2010

Women's individual
 Standard: 2010

References
Chess Results 2006
Chess Results 2010
Asian Xiangqi Federation

Board games
medalists